Listen to Art Farmer and the Orchestra is an album by trumpeter Art Farmer featuring performances recorded in 1962 and originally released on the Mercury label.

Reception

The Allmusic review stated "Oliver Nelson's arrangements provide great backdrops for the leader, as do the mix of dependable studio musicians and outstanding jazzmen assembled for the three sessions".

Track listing
 "Street of Dreams" (Sam M. Lewis, Victor Young) - 4:18     
 "Rain Check" (Billy Strayhorn) - 3:40     
 "Rue Prevail" (Art Farmer) - 4:08     
 "The Sweetest Sounds" (Richard Rodgers) - 4:38     
 "My Romance" (Lorenz Hart, Rodgers) - 4:57     
 "Fly Me to the Moon" (Bart Howard) - 2:53     
 "Naima" (John Coltrane) - 5:21     
 "Ruby" (Mitchell Parish, Heinz Roemheld) - 4:38  
Recorded at Webster Hall in New York City on August 10 (track 5), September 5 (tracks 1-3) and September 20 (tracks 4 & 6-8), 1962

Personnel
Art Farmer - flugelhorn
Ray Copeland, Rolf Ericson, Bernie Glow, Ernie Royal, Paul Serrano, Clark Terry, Snooky Young - trumpet
Jimmy Cleveland, Urbie Green, Tommy Mitchell - trombone
Paul Faulise, Tony Studd - bass trombone
Ray Alonge, Jim Buffington, Bob Northern - French horn
Danny Bank, Ray Beckenstein, Phil Bodner, Walt Levinsky, Romeo Penque, Stan Webb, Phil Woods - reeds
Tommy Flanagan - piano
Barry Galbraith, Jim Hall - guitar
George Duvivier - bass
Charlie Persip - drums
Ray Barretto, Willie Rodriguez - percussion
Oliver Nelson - arranger, conductor

References 

Mercury Records albums
Art Farmer albums
1963 albums
Albums arranged by Oliver Nelson